Shardlow and Great Wilne is a civil parish in the South Derbyshire district of Derbyshire, England.  The parish contains 48 listed buildings that are recorded in the National Heritage List for England.   Of these, one is listed at Grade II*, the middle of the three grades, and the others are at Grade II, the lowest grade.  The parish contains the village of Shardlow, the smaller village of Great Wilne, and the surrounding area.  Shardlow is at the southern end of the Trent and Mersey Canal, and a number of buildings relating to the canal are listed, including warehouses, mileposts, a bridge and a lock.  Most of the other listed buildings are houses, cottages and associated structures, farmhouses and farm buildings.  The rest of the listed buildings include public houses, a church and associated structures including a war memorial, a road milepost, the sign from a former toll house, and a school.


Key

Buildings

References

Citations

Sources

 

Lists of listed buildings in Derbyshire